Elasmia cave is a species of moth of the family Notodontidae. It occurs in New Mexico, Texas and possibly Mexico.

Adults are dark brown-grey with obscure transverse markings. Adults are on wing from April to early October.

Etymology
CAVE is the acronym, used by the U.S. National Park Service for Carlsbad Caverns National Park. The specific name of this species, cave, refers to the type locality, Carlsbad Caverns National Park.

References

Moths described in 2011
Notodontidae